Abbie Mary McManus (born 14 January 1993) is an English footballer who plays as a defender for Leicester City in the FA Women's Super League and the England national team. She has also represented England on the under-23 national team.

Club career

Early career and Manchester City
Prestwich-born McManus began playing football with her brother Scott. She joined a boys' team, then Bury Girls, where she was named Under-16s Most Improved Player in 2008. She signed for FA Women's Premier League Northern Division club Manchester City and established herself in the team which won the League and promotion to the National Division in 2011–12.

Sheffield FC
In August 2013, McManus transferred to Sheffield FC, making 13 league appearances during her single season at the club as Sheffield won the FA Women's Premier League Northern Division title.

Return to Manchester City
When Sheikh Mansour-backed Manchester City successfully bid for an FA WSL franchise in 2014, McManus returned to the club. She made her top division debut for Manchester City in May 2014 against Everton at the Etihad Stadium. She scored her first goal for the club against Liverpool during the 2014 WSL Cup. The team went on to win the WSL Cup after defeating Arsenal 1–0 in the final.

In April 2015, she competed in the 2015–16 FA Women's Cup. Manchester City were eliminated by Chelsea in the semi-finals.

In August 2016, she suffered an ankle injury that prevented her from playing in the remaining part of the 2016 FA WSL season. In December 2016, she re-signed with Manchester City. In 2017, she made her UEFA Women's Champions League debut in Manchester City's 1–0 win over Fortuna Hjørring. She agreed to extend her Manchester City contract in June 2018.

Manchester United
On 17 May 2019, McManus announced she was leaving Manchester City, having spent a total of 12 years at the club. A week later, it was announced she was to join Manchester United, the club she grew up supporting, ahead of the 2019–20 season. McManus made her debut for Manchester United against Manchester City in the FA WSL on 7 September 2019, a 1–0 loss in the inaugural Manchester derby. She scored her first goal for the club on 15 January 2020 in a 2–1 win over Brighton & Hove Albion in a League Cup quarter-final. She left United at the end of the 2020–21 season following the expiry of her contract.

Loan to Tottenham Hotspur
On 21 January 2021, McManus joined Tottenham Hotspur on loan for the rest of the season.

Leicester City
On 27 July 2021, McManus signed with newly-promoted Leicester City ahead of their first season in the FA WSL.

International career
In February 2018, McManus was in an Asda supermarket buying some eggs when she received a telephone call informing her of her first call-up to the senior England team. She was a late replacement for Steph Houghton, who withdrew from the squad for the 2018 SheBelieves Cup with an injured ankle. At the opening match of the tournament, a 4–1 win over France, McManus won her first cap as a 14th-minute substitute for Anita Asante.

She retained her place in the squad for England's successful 2019 FIFA Women's World Cup qualification campaign and hailed the influence of new national team coach Phil Neville: "I didn't seem to be ticking the boxes when Mark Sampson and Mo Marley were in charge but that seems to have changed since Phil has been involved. I'm really enjoying things under Phil because he's very tactical and that's what we like at City, too. I'm delighted to be picked for the seniors and I hope I can continue to be picked. I want to improve under Phil and learn from him."

In February 2019, McManus was called up for her second consecutive SheBelieves Cup, making two appearances as England won the tournament for the first time.

In June 2019, McManus was selected in England's 23-player squad for the 2019 FIFA Women's World Cup in France. She made three appearances including two starts as England reached the semi-finals.

Personal life
McManus' brother Scott is also a footballer; he last played for non-league side Coalville Town.

McManus is in a relationship with GB national handball player and former London 2012 Olympian Holly Lam-Moores.

Career statistics

Club
.

Honours

Club
Manchester City
 FA Women's Premier League Northern Division: 2011–12
 FA WSL: 2016
 FA Women's Cup: 2016–17, 2018–19
 FA WSL Cup: 2014, 2016, 2018–19

Sheffield
 FA Women's Premier League Northern Division: 2013–14

International
England
 SheBelieves Cup: 2019

References

External links

 Profile at the Manchester United F.C. website
 Profile at the Football Association website
 
 
 

Living people
English women's footballers
Women's association football defenders
1993 births
Women's Super League players
Manchester City W.F.C. players
Sportspeople from Prestwich
England women's under-23 international footballers
England women's international footballers
FA Women's National League players
Sheffield F.C. Ladies players
Footballers from Greater Manchester
2019 FIFA Women's World Cup players
Manchester United W.F.C. players
Leicester City W.F.C. players
LGBT association football players
Lesbian sportswomen
English LGBT sportspeople
21st-century LGBT people
Tottenham Hotspur F.C. Women players